Ghazi Fahad (born 1978) is a coach and former international Iraqi football player, he played as a midfielder.

Playing career
Ghazi started his playing career at Basra club Al-Zubayr, where he was scouted by Al Minaa manager Hadi Ahmed who signed him for the first team. Ghazi made his debut against Al Quwa Al Jawiya  and remained an important player for the club in all four seasons he spent there. Ghazi then moved to Duhok SC for one season playing under Natiq Hashim. The player showed his quality in many matches including one against his former team Al Minaa where he scored. Following his season with Duhok, Ghazi wanted a move to a Baghdad club in order to improve his chance of making the national team, his first choice was Al Quwa Al Jawiya, but he failed to agree to a contract and signed for rivals Al-Zawraa instead. In the Baghdadi club, Ghazi Fahad continued his impressive performances and finally received a call-up to the Iraqi national football team in 2002, where he won the 2002 West Asian Football Federation Championship. Fahad Ghazi returned to Al Minaa and helped the team achieve 2nd place in the 2004–05 Iraqi Premier League. Ghazi returned once again to Duhok SC and spent a season with the Kurdish club. Following their elimination in the second round of the 2006–07 Iraqi Premier League, Ghazi Fahad retired and joined the coaching staff at Al Ain.

Managerial career
Following his retirement, Ghazi joined Al Ain's youth setup as a coach, and was eventually promoted to the head of academy in 2009.  As a coach, Ghazi is credited to having scouted and neutered Emirati superstar Omar Abdulrahman. In 2013 Al Ain agreed to loan Ghazi Fahad to his boyhood club Al Minaa for six months. Ghazi managed the team for 11 matches, winning five and losing five, while achieving a draw in the remaining one. He cut his time short after only four months due to receiving death threats.

Ghazi returned to coach Al Minaa once again in 2017, replacing Romanian Ion Marin. The Manager led Al Mina'a to a sixth-place finish, winning four of the nine matches he was in charge for. Following his performances as a manager, Al Mina'a signed him on a full-time contract to manage the club for the 2017-18 season. However he resigned before the start of the season due to a dispute with club president Jalil Hanoon.

Managerial statistics

Honours

Player

Club
Iraqi Premier League
 Runner up 2004–05 with Al Minaa

International
 WAFF Championship:
 Winner in 2002

References

External links
 Ghazi Fahad at Dsg-widgets.com
 
 Interview with Fahad in 2013
 Al-Minaa Club: Sailors of south

1978 births
Iraqi footballers
Iraq international footballers
Association football midfielders
Living people
Basra
People from Basra
Sportspeople from Basra
Al-Mina'a SC players
Duhok SC players
Al-Zawraa SC players
Iraqi football managers
Expatriate football managers in the United Arab Emirates
Al-Mina'a SC managers